Binna Burra is a rural locality in the Scenic Rim Region, Queensland, Australia. It borders New South Wales.

Geography 
The locality is a long thin valley bounded by the ridge of the Darlington Range to the west and the ridge of the Beechmont Range to the east. It is bounded to the south by the border between Queensland and New South Wales. The Coomera River rises in the far south of the locality and flows north along the valley and exits the locality to the north (Illanbah).

History 

Education 
There are no schools in Binna Burra. The nearest primary school is Beechmont State School in neighbouring Beechmont. The nearest secondary school is Nerang State High School in Nerang.

References 

Scenic Rim Region
Localities in Queensland